Claude Haffner (Arabic: كلود هافنر; born 1976), is a French-Congolese filmmaker and production manager primarily direct documentary films. She has made several critically acclaimed documentaries including Ko Bongisa Mutu, Défilé Célianthe and Noire ici, blanche là-bas.

Personal life
She was born in 1976 in Kinshasa, Democratic Republic of the Congo to a French father and a Congolese mother. Her father Pierre Haffner is also a researcher and film lecturer at the French Cultural Center in Kinshasa, which influence Claude to start her cinema career. Her mother Sudila Mwembe is from Zaïre (today's Democratic Republic of the Congo). At the very young age, she went France with family and never returned Congo. Then she grew up in Alsace with her brother Frédéric Haffner. His father has a collection of African art together with photos and taped accounts about Congo and Africa. He died in 2000, where Claude decided to return to Congo with her mother to meet her Congolese family.

From 1994 to 1999, she studied History and a University Diploma in Cinema and Audiovisual at the University of Strasbourg. In 2005, Claude completed her master's degree at Sorbonne University.

Career
After graduating from university, she worked on numerous short films to learn techniques of filmmaking. In 2000, Claude worked as the Script supervisor for the short film La fourchette. The she joined as a production assistant at 'Canal +', where she was able to work with Agnès Varda, her "mentor", on the editing of the film Les Glaneurs et la Glaneuse. After the film, she developed interest to direct documentaries. Therefore, in 2002, she followed a training course in documentary filmmaking at Altermédia (Saint-Denis training center). During this period, she interviewed her mother who lived in Brunstatt about her country, her family and her history.

In 2002, Haffner studied documentary filmmaking at the Altermedia School in Paris. Her maiden direction was a "film-essay" titled Ko Bongisa Mutu in a Congolese hair salon in Paris. In 2004, she directed the documentary La Canne musicale, a promenade with the French filmmaker and ethnographer Jean Rouch. This was happened a few days before his death.

In 2005, After two years of research on African Cinema, she made the documentary D'une fleur double et de 4000 autres which was focused on African Cinema history. After the film, she moved to South Africa in the same year. In 2009, she worked as a production manager and researcher on the docu-drama The Manuscripts of Timbuktu by Zola Maseko and By Any Means Necessary by Ramadan Suleman. Claude continued to work and teach on African Cinema at two Johannesburg-based film schools: AFDA, The School for the Creative Economy (AFDA) and Big Fish School of Digital Filmmaking. In 2011, she returned to France to achieve her documentary Noire ici, blanche là-bas.

Filmography

References

External links
 

Democratic Republic of the Congo film directors
Living people
French women film directors
1976 births
Democratic Republic of the Congo women
French film directors
People from Kinshasa
People from Alsace
University of Strasbourg alumni
French people of Democratic Republic of the Congo descent